Walter Osterwalder (born 20 August 1934) is a Swiss rower. He competed in the men's eight event at the 1960 Summer Olympics.

References

External links
 

1934 births
Living people
Swiss male rowers
Olympic rowers of Switzerland
Rowers at the 1960 Summer Olympics
Sportspeople from the canton of St. Gallen